Johannes Lohs (24 June 1889 – 14 August 1918) was a successful and highly decorated German U-boat commander in the Kaiserliche Marine during World War I.

Early life
Lohs was born on 24 June 1889 at Einsiedel, Saxony. He was the son of plant owner Oswald Lohs. He first went to school in his home village and later to a grammar school in Chemnitz.

Lohs entered on 1 April 1909 as midshipman the Imperial Navy, completed his basic training at the Großer Kreuzer  and then came for further training to the naval Academy, where he was appointed on April 12, 1910 to Fähnrich zur See. On November 3, 1911 he was transferred to the light cruiser  and promoted on 19 September 1912 to Leutnant zur See. From 23 December 1912 Lohs acted as a signal officer on the light cruiser .

World War I
On 2 May 1915 Lohs was promoted to Oberleutnant zur See. For one month Lohs was second radio officer on the battlecruiser , then he moved to U-Bootschule for two months. Afterwards he became a monitoring officer at the torpedo boat division. Lohs had also some very good ideas on U-boat warfare and new tactics and on 24 April 1918 he received the Pour le Mérite.

On 3 August 1918, he sailed from Zeebrugge for the last time. The last contact he made with the base was on the evening of 14 August as UB-57 was homeward bound roughly in the area of the Sandiette Bank, east of the Strait of Dover. Nothing more was heard. Lohs and 33 men lost their lives.UB-57 is believed to have run onto a mine. Lohs' body washed up on shore a week later and he is buried in the military cemetery at Vlissingen.

He also damaged 17 other ships and sank the armed merchant cruiser HMS Moldavia. 

In the later Kriegsmarine, the 3rd U-boat Flotilla in Kiel was named after him.

References

Grogan, John. Johann Lohs: The Channel Hunter

1889 births
1918 deaths
People from the Kingdom of Saxony
U-boat commanders (Imperial German Navy)
Recipients of the Pour le Mérite (military class)
German military personnel killed in World War I
Military personnel from Chemnitz
People who died at sea
Imperial German Navy personnel of World War I